The 1948 Maine gubernatorial election took place on September 13, 1948. Incumbent Republican Governor Horace A. Hildreth, was term limited and seeking election to the United States Senate (eventually losing the Republican primary to Margaret Chase Smith), thus did not run.  Republican mayor of Augusta Frederick G. Payne faced off against Democratic challenger Louis B. Lausier, defeating him in a landslide. Neil S. Bishop unsuccessfully ran for the Republican nomination

Results

Notes

1948
Maine
Gubernatorial
Maine gubernatorial election